The Volgograd State University of Architecture and Civil Engineering is one of the major Universities in Volgograd (formerly Stalingrad). It was founded in December 1951 and gained university status on December 29, 2003. Previous names were:
 Stalingrad Institute of Engineers of Municipal Economy
 Volgograd Institute of Engineers of Municipal Economy
 Volgograd Civil Engineering Institute
 Volgograd State Academy of Architecture and Civil Engineering
 Volgograd State University of Architecture and Civil Engineering

References

External links 
 http://vgasu.ru/

Universities in Volga Region
Universities in Volgograd Oblast